Keith Joseph (born December 9, 1981 in Dallas, Texas) is a former professional American football running back in the NFL for the New Orleans Saints.

High School and College
Joseph attended Lamar High School in Houston, Texas. He was named the Houston Touchdown Club Offensive Player of the Year after rushing for 1,648 yards and 25 touchdowns as a senior. He was injured and did not play as a junior, but earned first-team all-district honors as a sophomore after rushing for 1,237 yards and 17 touchdowns, and was the district's freshman of the year.

Joseph signed with Texas A&M and redshirted in 2000. He started three games in 2001 and finished the season as the team's second leading rusher. Joseph started three games at fullback in 2002, and eight games in 2003, and all 12 as a senior in 2004.

He finished his senior season with 207 yards and three touchdowns on 58 carries. He also had four receptions for 17 yards. At A&M, he was known for his workmanlike style and his rare combination of size, speed, and strength.

NFL
Although Joseph went undrafted in the 2005 NFL Draft, he was signed as an undrafted free agent by the New Orleans Saints on April 27, 2005. He was released after the preseason, but immediately signed to the Saints' practice squad, where he spent the entire season.

Joseph was re-signed by the Saints to a one-year contract in January and began the season as the backup to starting fullback Mike Karney, but suffered a right MCL sprain in his knee during the first game of the season. He was placed on the injured reserve on Sep 13, 2006, ending his 2006 season. He was cut from the Saints in March 2007.

External links
NFL draft preview
MCL injury
Bench Press record

1981 births
Living people
Players of American football from Dallas
American football running backs
New Orleans Saints players
Texas A&M Aggies football players